Palats Sportu (former Marshala Zhukova) is a station on Kharkiv Metro's Kholodnohirsko–Zavodska Line. It was opened on 11 August 1978.

On 17 May 2016, the station was renamed according to the law banning Communist names in Ukraine.

References

Kharkiv Metro stations
Railway stations opened in 1978